Sr. Francesco Ferramosca (born August 23, 1893) was a professional violinist from Viggiano, Basilicata, Italy, who, in early Johannesburg, South Africa, rose to fame in the 1910s as one of the most talented violinists in the country.  He adjudicated many competitions for promising musical students.  As an acclaimed soloist and orchestral leader he performed in various locations in Southern Africa between 1907-1932 to audiences in large halls, tearooms and bars, social events and Eisteddfods.

Early life
Francesco was the fifth child of Giuseppe Ferramosca (b. November 11, 1850) and Agnese Mariarosa Miraglia (b. January 19, 1858, m. June 8, 1879).  Apart from two children that died young, he and his three remaining siblings were all talented musicians in Viggiano.  He started learning the violin at age six and very soon showed promise.  However after some years he contracted tuberculosis and his health deteriorated.  It was then that his father decided to bring him to South Africa, known for its dry climate and TB facilities.  The family had contacts with a number of Italian musicians in Johannesburg, so Giuseppe brought Francesco and his brother Nicola to Johannesburg around 1907 to seek treatment for him.  Amongst his contacts were Sr. Galeffe, a cellist, and Sr. Lorenzo Danza, a pianist.  Francesco was left in their charge, and his father and brother returned to Viggiano.

Career
Whilst receiving treatment, Francesco continued to study violin.  In those days, Johannesburg resembled an overgrown mining camp with very few large buildings surrounded by ordinary houses.  There was little work outside of the mines  and almost nothing for a young musician.  Francesco was reduced to playing in the streets for a few pennies, but that proved to be the start to his career.  Around 1911, a renowned overseas music trio consisting of the three Cherniavsky brothers, Alex (violin), Leo (cello) and David (piano), were touring South Africa.  They saw Francesco performing on Eloff Street, and were so impressed at his tone and virtuosity, they spent months giving him more training and polishing up his technique.  This eventually led to Francesco joining a trio with Sr. Lorenzo Danza on piano and Reuben Goldberg on cello.  The trio became very popular, and played in venues throughout The Reef, Pretoria, and in neighboring Lourenço Marques (now Maputo), Mozambique, as well as socialite weddings.

During his concerts, he met Doris Gwendoline Helliwell, an accomplished concert pianist, who thereafter accompanied him on various occasions.  Francesco married Doris (m. January 11, 1916) and they had two boys, Joseph Frederick Lorenzo ("Genzie") Ferramosca (b. May 17, 1916, d. January 3, 2007), and Frank Eugene ("Chickles") Ferramosca (surname changed to Mitchell) (b. January 21, 1921, d. March 14, 2003).

The trio played regularly at Johannesburg's Balcony Tea Room (later to become The Corner Lounge ) on the first floor of the Cuthberts building .  In the following years, the trio expanded to an orchestra of seven ("Orchestra Ferramosca"), with Francesco as leader, and were regular performers at The Corner Lounge.  The orchestra also played frequently at The Lounge, Madeleine's and Gloria.  By 1920 Francesco was recognized as the finest violinist in the country.  In June 1924, he left with his family for a short tour of Italy, and a benefit concert for him was arranged by an "influential committee", with a "highly attractive musical programme".

In 1925 he and his orchestra were offered a regular position at the Waldorf Cafe , Cape Town and decided to relocate with his family to Mouille Point.  While in Cape Town, he performed with the Cape Town Symphony Orchestra on a number of occasions.  After three years, he returned to Johannesburg in early 1928, where he performed with the Johannesburg Symphony Orchestra and played evenings at the O.K. tea room and finally at Rondi's.  The orchestra was the first to broadcast from a tea room, having a regular half-hour slot on the local SABC radio station .

Later life
The damp air and bad weather in Cape Town had a detrimental effect on Francesco's health and his TB resurfaced.  After returning to Johannesburg, his health deteriorated significantly and after some months he was admitted into isolation at the Nelspoort Sanitarium  in the Karoo desert, renowned for its treatment of TB.  He made good progress and came back to Johannesburg in October 1928 to resume his career.  However the odd hours and smoky atmosphere took its toll and he spent another three months at Nelspoort.  He returned to Johannesburg, but soon after succumbed to a throat affliction, and passed away in May 1932 at the Hillbrow General Hospital.  He is buried at Westpark Cemetery, Johannesburg.

Repertoire
Sampling of programmed performances:

Concertos:
Max Bruch
Beethoven
Brahms
Mendelsohn
Mozart

Violin Solos:
Sarasate
Brahms Hungarian Dances
Kreisler (in particular Liebeslied, Liebesfreud, Schon Rosmarin)

References

1893 births
1932 deaths
Male violinists
Italian violinists
People from Viggiano
20th-century Italian male musicians